A list of British films released in 1923.

1923

See also
 1923 in film
 1923 in the United Kingdom

References

External links
 

1923
Films
Lists of 1923 films by country or language
1920s in British cinema